Radio Edge was a Bangladeshi FM radio station, the headquarters of which radio is situated in Dhaka. It started broadcasting on 30 October 2017. Sometime in 2018 or 2019 the station shutdown, but the website is still online.

References

2017 establishments in Bangladesh
Organisations based in Dhaka
Radio stations in Bangladesh
Mass media in Dhaka
Defunct mass media in Bangladesh